Simmons High School is a secondary school in Hollandale, Mississippi. It serves grades 7–12.

History
The school was originally established in 1891 as "Hollandale Colored School". The building was a one-room schoolhouse with no windows or ceiling. In 1923, the one-room schoolhouse was replaced with a larger multi-room brick building. In 1950, Hollandale Colored School was renamed "Simmons High School" in honor of educator and former slave Emory Peter "E.P." Simmons.

Athletics
In 1970, the football team was established. Blue Devils are the school mascot. Blue and white are the school colors. The Blue Devils won state championship titles for division 1A in 2015, 2016, and 2017. In 2021 it lost the championship to Bay Springs High School.

Demographics
The demographic breakdown by race/ethnicity of the 225 students enrolled for the 2019–2020 school year was:
Black - 99.1%
Hispanic - 0.9%

The entire student body is categorized as economically disadvantaged. It is in the Hollandale School District.

Alumni
Larry Smith, NBA basketball player

References

Public high schools in Mississippi
Schools in Washington County, Mississippi